Hotel Victoria was built by Paran Stevens in 1877 in Manhattan, New York City, New York. Occupying the entire block on 27th Street, Broadway and Fifth Avenue, it was the only hotel in the city with entrances on both the latter thoroughfares. The hotel was owned by the American Hotel Victoria Company. George W. Sweeney served as president and Angus Gordon was manager. In 1911, it was announced that the hotel had been redecorated, renovated, and refurnished at a cost of $250,000. Room options included without bath, with bath, and suites with rates ranging between $1.50 and $6.00 per day. Accommodations were available for 500 guests. 

The hotel closed its doors on February 26, 1914. The furnishings were sold at auction the same day. The demolition was to make way for an office and loft building on the site after the hotel was torn down.

References

Bibliography

External links

1877 establishments in New York (state)
1914 disestablishments in New York (state)
Defunct hotels in Manhattan
Broadway (Manhattan)
Fifth Avenue
Demolished hotels in New York City
Buildings and structures demolished in 1914